The former Storm Lake Public Library is located in Storm Lake, Iowa, United States.  The Carnegie Corporation of New York accepted Storm Lake's application for a grant for $10,000 on December 4, 1903.  Designed by Paul O. Moratz, the new library was dedicated on September 29, 1906. After its use as a library, the building housed the museum for the Buena Vista County Historical Society.  It was listed on the National Register of Historic Places in 1983.

References

Library buildings completed in 1906
Carnegie libraries in Iowa
Storm Lake, Iowa
Libraries on the National Register of Historic Places in Iowa
National Register of Historic Places in Buena Vista County, Iowa
Museums in Buena Vista County, Iowa
1906 establishments in Iowa